Tropical Storm Brenda was the second named storm of the 1960 Atlantic hurricane season. It developed in the northeastern Gulf of Mexico on July 28, and after moving ashore over the Florida Peninsula, it attained tropical storm status. It accelerated northeast along the U.S. East Coast, ultimately peaking as a moderate storm with winds of  before crossing the Mid-Atlantic states and New England; it dissipated on July 31 over southern Canada. It inflicted moderate damage in Florida, the worst since Hurricane Easy of 1950, and dropped heavy rainfall as far north as New York City. Its total damage was estimated at US$5 million, and only indirect deaths were blamed on it.

Meteorological history

A weak low-pressure area that organized in the northeast Gulf of Mexico began to intensify on July 28, while located west of the Tampa Bay.  Early in its life, the system had a broad circulation with primarily light winds, similar to that of a subtropical storm. The storm is estimated to have become a tropical depression earlier the previous day as it moved toward the northeast. It made landfall along the Florida coast near Cross City and continued inland, gradually accelerating. It likely attained tropical storm status at around 1200 UTC on July 28 while its center was situated west of Tampa. The cyclone was named Brenda after reconnaissance aircraft confirmed that it had reached tropical storm strength.

Brenda tracked northward, hugging the Georgia and South Carolina coasts before moving inland over North Carolina on July 29. It attained its peak winds of  late that evening, while situated south of Wilmington. Brenda crossed the Delmarva Peninsula and rapidly tracked into southern New Jersey. The storm crossed the state and eventually made another landfall in Brooklyn, New York before making yet another landfall in coastal Connecticut.

At around 0000 UTC on July 31, Brenda moved into Massachusetts. Shortly thereafter, it lost its tropical characteristics and transitioned into an extratropical cyclone. It dissipated by August 1 over southern Canada. Because Brenda was in the vicinity of land for most of its course, it was not able to intensify beyond tropical storm status.

Preparations and impact

In advance of the storm, tropical storm advisories and wind warnings were issued from Florida to Maine.

Rainfall from Tropical Storm Brenda affected at least 16 states. The heaviest precipitation fell in western Florida near Tampa, east of the storm's center; the Tampa International Airport recorded  of rainfall. Extensive flooding occurred in the west-central Florida Peninsula. However, storm tides were not severe. Around the Naples area, Brenda's effects were primarily light, although small boat and dock facilities and roads sustained some damage. A private seawall at Clearwater was breached in two places by the cyclone.

Brenda was considered the worst storm to strike the area since Hurricane Easy in 1950. While no casualties are directly blamed on the storm, at least one traffic-related death took place. According to an American Red Cross Disaster Service report encompassing eight Florida counties, 11 houses sustained significant damage, while 567 suffered more minor damage. Around 590 families were affected overall. Total monetary damage is placed at near $5 million.

In and around Wilmington, the storm caused minor damage to roofs and windows of some beachfront structures. Power was temporarily interrupted due to fallen tree limbs. Heavy rainfall caused flooding on streams and rivers, and in some areas the precipitation helped to end a serious drought. Some boats were swamped, and the winds ripped the roof off a cottage at Long Beach. The heavy rain and high tides flooded tobacco fields.

Moderate rains extended northward into the Mid-Atlantic states, with lighter totals reported farther north in New York. At New York City,  of precipitation fell, beating the one-day July record of  set in 1872. The heavy rains flooded parts of LaGuardia Airport. The storm caused travel delays and ran several ships aground, but otherwise inflicted little serious damage. The storm forced the cancellation of two American League baseball games and the postponement of several other sporting events.

See also

 List of United States hurricanes
 List of Florida hurricanes
 List of New England hurricanes

References

Brenda
Brenda (1960)
Brenda
1960 in Canada
1960 natural disasters in the United States
Hurricanes in Canada
1960 disasters in Canada